The 1970 Washington Darts season was the team's first season in the North American Soccer League, and the club's fourth season in professional soccer.  Previously the club fielded a team in the American Soccer League.  In their initial run in the NASL, the team earned first place in the Southern Division and finished with the top record in the league. As division champions they automatically qualified for the championship game known as the NASL Final.

Background

Review

Competitions

NASL regular season

G = Games, W = Wins, L = Losses, T= Ties, GF = Goals For, GA = Goals Against, PT= point system

6 points for a win, 
3 points for a tie,
0 points for a loss,
1 point for each goal scored up to three per game.

Results summaries

Results by round

Match reports

NASL Playoffs

NASL Final 1970

Match reports

First leg

Second leg

Statistics

Transfers

See also
1970 Washington Darts

References 

1970
Washington Darts
Washington Darts
Washington